The University of Papua New Guinea (UPNG) is a university located in Port Moresby, capital of Papua New Guinea. It was established by ordinance of the Australian administration in 1965. This followed the Currie Commission which had enquired into higher education in Papua New Guinea. The University of Papua New Guinea Act No. 18, 1983 bill repealing the old Ordinance was passed by the National Parliament in August 1983.

The university has moved from a departmental to a school structure to foster interdisciplinary and inter-school relationships. The university's library is known as the Michael Somare Library, named after the country's first Prime Minister Sir Michael Somare. Multiple sources have included it among the best universities in Papua New Guinea.

Infrastructure
In recent times, the university has seen significant changes to its ageing infrastructure with the Government of Papua New Guinea handing over the 2015 Pacific Games Village to the university for the purpose of becoming student dormitories. There are several other major infrastructure developments made in partnership with the Australian Government for a new and modern lecture theater, School of Business and Public Policy complex and a Student Services building. The Government of Papua New Guinea is also funding several projects such as School of Natural and Physical Sciences building and the newly completed School of Law complex.

Students
There are more than 15,000 students annually in Port Moresby campuses, five open campuses and 13 study centres. While the majority of the students are from Papua New Guinea, there are international students from other Pacific countries, especially from the Solomon Islands, who currently study at the university. The UPNG School of Law is currently the only law school in Papua New Guinea. The School of Business and Public Policy offers MBA and Masters in Economics and Public Policy programs.

Courses
There are programs in:

Economics
Medicine
Pharmacy
Health Sciences
Physical and Natural Sciences
Law
Business
Humanities
Social Sciences
Sustainable Development

Problem-based learning (PBL) approaches are used.

Alumni
Yolarnie Amepou, herpetologist and conservationist
Vincent Eri, The fifth Governor General of Papua New Guinea
Salamo Injia,  former Chief Justice of Papua New Guinea
Kalkot Mataskelekele, President of Vanuatu
Mekere Morauta, former Prime Minister of Papua New Guinea
Hank Nelson, Australian historian
Cecilia Nembou, educator, women's rights activist, and first female vice-chancellor for a university in Papua New Guinea
Peter O'Neill, Former Prime Minister of Papua New Guinea
Powes Parkop, governor for National Capital District
Gibbs Salika, Chief Justice of Papua New Guinea
Paias Wingti, former Prime Minister of Papua New Guinea

Affiliation
Association of Commonwealth Universities

References

External links

Homepage

 
Academic staff of the University of Papua New Guinea
1965 establishments in Papua New Guinea
Buildings and structures in Port Moresby
Educational institutions established in 1965